Scrobipalpa confusa is a moth in the family Gelechiidae. It was described by Povolný in 1966. It is found in Syria.

The ground colour of the forewings is whitish. The hindwings are milky white.

References

Scrobipalpa
Moths described in 1966